This is a list of airports in Vietnam, grouped by type and sorted by location. Airports in Vietnam are managed and operated by Airports Corporation of Vietnam.

Civil airports

Military Airports

Proposed Airports

Former Airports

Notes: 
Among 10 international airports mentioned above, only five are served with current international flights including Tan Son Nhat (Ho Chi Minh city), Noi Bai (Hanoi city), Danang (Danang city), Cam Ranh (Nha Trang city) and Phu Quoc ( Phu Quoc Island). While other though managed to be international hubs, but has just served in domestic routes so far.

See also
 Transport in Vietnam
 List of airports by ICAO code: V#VV - Vietnam
 List of the busiest airports in Vietnam
 Wikipedia: WikiProject Aviation/Airline destination lists: Asia#Viet Nam

References

External links

 Lists of airports in Vietnam:
 Great Circle Mapper
 FallingRain.com

Vietnam
 
Airports
Airports
Vietnam